Syllepte nigriflava is a moth in the family Crambidae. It was described by Charles Swinhoe in 1894. It is found in the Indian states of Meghalaya and Sikkim.

Adults are orange, the forewings without a spot in the cell. The discocellular spot of both wings, the antemedial line of the forewings and the postmedial lines of both wings are black and the outer area and margin are unmarked.

References

Moths described in 1894
Moths of Asia
nigriflava
Taxa named by Charles Swinhoe